My Mother's Eyes is an album by jazz pianist Jaki Byard with the Apollo Stompers.

Background
This was pianist Jaki Byard's third album with the Apollo Stompers. The previous two were Phantasies and Phantasies II.

Music and recording
The album was recorded in March 1998. Six of the tracks are Byard originals.

Releases
The album was unreleased at the time of Byard's apparent murder in 1999. It was reissued on January 16, 2013, by M&I.

Track listing
"Garr"
"My Mother's Eyes"
"St. Thomas"
"La Rosita"
"With a Song in My Heart / Once in a While"
"Spanish Tinge"
"More Than You Know"
"Out Front, Out Back"
"As Time Goes By / Misty"
"I Don't Know What Kind Of Blues I've Got"
"What Is This Thing Called Love"
"Aluminum Baby"
"Japanese Sandman"
"Darryl"

Personnel
Jed Levy, David Glasser, Tom Murray, Sam Furnace, Patience Higgins – sax
Roger Parrett, Al Bryant, Tommy Corcoran, James Zollar – trumpet
Carl Reinlib, Steve Swell, Jason Forsythe, Dale Turk – trombone
Jaki Byard – piano
Peter Leitch – guitar
Ralph Hamperian – bass
Richard Allen – drums

References

Jaki Byard albums
1998 albums